The Pinnacle Peak is a part and third highest summit with elevation  of the Nun Kun mountain massif of the western Himalayan Range, located near the Suru valley, on Kargil Zanskar road 80 kilometers west of Kargil town.

The Pinnacle Peak is located north-east of Nun  which is the highest summit of the massif and is separated from it by a snowy plateau of 4 km in length, between them rises another peak Kun .

Mountaineering
Early exploration of the massif included a visit in 1898 and three visits by Arthur Neve, in 1902, 1904, and 1910. In 1903, Dutch mountaineer Dr. H. Sillem investigated the massif and discovered the high plateau between the peaks; he reached an altitude of 6,400 m (21,000 ft) on Nun. In 1906, the Pinnacle Peak was first ascended by a noted explorer couple Fanny Bullock Workman and her husband William Hunter Workman. They also toured extensively through the massif and produced a map; however, controversy surrounded the Workmans' claims, and few trigonometrical points were given for the region, so that the map they produced was not usable.

The massif is accessed by 210 kilometers by road from Srinagar NH 1D up to Kargil and then 80 kilometers via Kargil Zanskar road.

References

External links
 Suru and Zanskar valley
 Topography of Nun Kun ex Geographical Journal 1920

Climbing areas of India
Landforms of Ladakh
Mountains of Ladakh